Pishkeli Jan-e Pain (also Romanized as Pīshkelī Jān-e Pā’īn; also known as  Peshgel Jān-e Pā’īn and Pīshkījān) is a village in Pir Kuh Rural District, Deylaman District, Siahkal County, Gilan Province, Iran. At the 2006 census, its population was 160, in 36 families.

References 

Populated places in Siahkal County